Heshan is a county-level city of central Guangxi, China, located on the lower reaches of the Hongshui River. It is under the administration of Laibin City.

Administrative divisions
Heshan administers only 1 town and 2 townships:

The only town is Lingnan (岭南镇)

Townships:
Beisi Township (北泗乡), Heli Township (河里乡)

References

External links

County-level divisions of Guangxi
Cities in Guangxi
Laibin